Ugwunagbo is a local government area of Abia State, Nigeria.
 
It has an area of 108 km and had a population of 97,710 at the 2011 census. It is a suburb of Aba.

Economy
Ugwunagbo depends solely on farming. It supplies farm products like yam, maize, cocoa, and palm oil to Aba and environs. Ugwunagbo also have little deposit of crude oil which can be found in Obuzo. It also has substantial cities like Obegu, Ngwayiekwe, Ihie, and Asa-Umunka.

References

Local Government Areas in Abia State
Populated places in Abia State